Frédéric de Civry (21 August 1861 – 15 March 1893) was a French track cyclist who generally competed over 20 to 50 miles. He rode most frequently in professional races in England, but was considered an amateur rider in his native France. He was the French national sprint champion in 1881 and 1882, and the national stayer champion in 1886 and 1887. In 1883, he won the 50-mile Championships in Leicester, which were reported in some newspapers as deciding the champion of the world.

Life and career
Frédéric de Civry was born in Paris on 21 August 1861. He received his education in England, and spent much of his cycling career in that country. He was generally considered to be an amateur cyclist in France, and frequently competed in that category, but Hugh Dauncey, in French Cycling: A Social and Cultural History, suggested that he was financially dependent upon the sport, and was considered a professional by the English press. He competed in the 1881 Grand Prix of Angers, finishing as the overall champion, and the sprint champion. In the same year, he became the French National Sprint Champion and was second overall at the Blois road race.  In late 1881, he competed twice against the English champion, John Keen. In the first race at The Crystal Palace, de Civry was given a one-minute head start, and won when Keen retired halfway through. The second was a scratch 20-mile race at the same venue. Keen again retired, after 11 miles, and De Civry completed the race in 1 hour 4:21, beating the professional record by just over five seconds.

De Civry repeated his successes in Angers and at the French national championships in 1882, and later that year, he competed in a 25-mile race in Leicester, dubbed the "championship of the world" in the English press. Twenty miles into the race, de Civry tried to break away from the other riders and establish a lead, but failed, and retired with three laps of the race to go; R Howell of Wolverhampton won the race. The following year on 24 March 1883, de Civry competed in a 50-mile race, once again in Leicester, variously entitled the "Championship of England", or the "Fifty Miles Professional Bicycle Championship of the world". Ten miles into the race, de Civry opened a lead of half a lap, and continued to increase it throughout the race. He won, completing the distance in 3 hours, 13:40, over three minutes ahead of the next competitor. The following Monday, he took part in the 10-mile race, but retired shortly before reaching half distance. The 50-mile championship was held again in August of the same year, in which de Civry lost his title to F. Wood of Leicester. In April the following year, de Civry competed for the 50-mile championship once again, but was involved in a collision with Wood, which took them both out of the race. He also took part in the one and ten mile championships, but did not win either.

During 1885, de Civry won the Grand Prix of Angers once again, and finished second in the French national sprint championships. He competed without success in the championships in England. In each of 1886 and 1887, he was the French National Stayer Champion. Two years later, he was arrested in France in relation to gambling debts incurred in Monaco and Paris. He died on 15 March 1893 from tuberculosis, aged 32. During his cycling career, he won 211 of his 331 races.

References

1861 births
1893 deaths
French male cyclists
Cyclists from Paris
19th-century deaths from tuberculosis
Tuberculosis deaths in France